Ellen Galford is an American-born Scottish writer. She was born in the US and migrated to the United Kingdom in 1971, after a brief marriage in New York City. She came out in the mid-1970s. She has lived in Glasgow and London and now lives in Edinburgh with her partner. She is Jewish. Her works include four lesbian novels:

Moll Cutpurse, Her True History (1984)
The Fires of Bride (1986)
Queendom Come (1990)
The Dyke and the Dybbuk (1993)

Galford was involved in recording Edinburgh's LGBT community history for the Remember When project.

Awards
Winner of the 1994 Lambda Literary Award for Best Lesbian and Gay Humor
Finalist for the 1995 American Library Association Gay, Lesbian, and Bisexual Award for Literature

See also
Lesbian fiction

References

Year of birth missing (living people)
Living people
American emigrants to Scotland
Scottish women novelists
American lesbian writers
Scottish humorists
Lesbian novelists
Lambda Literary Award winners
20th-century Scottish novelists
American LGBT novelists
20th-century Scottish women writers
Women humorists
Jewish women writers
Lesbian Jews
Jewish novelists
Scottish lesbian writers
Scottish LGBT novelists